Voronezhsky Uyezd (Воронежский уезд) was one of the subdivisions of the Voronezh Governorate of the Russian Empire. It was situated in the northern part of the governorate. Its administrative centre was Voronezh.

Demographics
At the time of the Russian Empire Census of 1897, Voronezhsky Uyezd had a population of 273,832. Of these, 98.3% spoke Russian, 0.5% Yiddish, 0.4% Polish, 0.4% Ukrainian and 0.2% German as their native language.

References

 
Uezds of Voronezh Governorate
Voronezh Governorate